The State Antitrust Enforcement Venue Act of 2021 is a proposed antitrust bill in the United States Congress. The legislation was introduced in the House of Representatives by Ken Buck (R-CO) as H.R. 3460 on May 21, 2021. Companion legislation was introduced in the Senate by Mike Lee (R-UT) as S. 1787 on May 24, 2021. 

The legislation would prevent antitrust lawsuits filed by multiple state attorneys general (state AGs) from being consolidated or transferred to a separate venue at the request of a company. Proponents of the bill argue that the current law helps companies accused of anti-competitive conduct by allowing suits to be consolidated or transferred in a more favorable venue at their request.

On June 14, 2022, the Senate passed the legislation by voice vote.

History 
The legislation was introduced days after Google filed to transfer an antitrust suit from the Texas Attorney General's office and fourteen other state AGs to its home court in San Francisco, California.

In June 2021, a bipartisan coalition of 52 state AGs wrote a letter to Congress in support of the legislation. Lina Khan, chair of the Federal Trade Commission (FTC), urged members of the Senate to support the legislation in February 2022. Buck, who introduced the legislation in the House of Representatives, argued that states "should have the same benefit that is already afforded to federal antitrust enforcers — to select and remain in their preferred venue".

Provisions 
The legislation would allow antitrust lawsuits filed by state attorneys general to remain in their original court district, rather than be transferred or consolidated elsewhere. With the exception of suits filed by a federal agencies, antitrust lawsuits filed in multiple federal court districts can be consolidated in a single venue at a litigant's request.  

If passed, the State Antitrust Enforcement Venue Act of 2021 would create a carve-out for state AGs from the Judicial Panel on Multidistrict Litigation (JPML) akin to the relevant exemption for federal agencies.

Voting history 
In June 2021, the House Judiciary Committee in favor of advancing H.R. 3460 to the House floor by a 34–7 margin. On September 23, 2021, the Senate Judiciary Committee voted to advance the legislation to a full vote in the Senate by voice vote. 

On June 14, 2022, the Senate passed the legislation unanimously. Buck, who introduced the House version of the bill, praised the Senate's vote, describing it marking "the beginning of a new era of antitrust reform and proof-of-concept for a bipartisan reform coalition of conservatives and progressives".

Legislative History

See also 

 American Innovation and Choice Online Act
 Open App Markets Act
 United States antitrust law

References 

United States proposed federal antitrust legislation
Proposed legislation of the 117th United States Congress
United States antitrust law